Maledictus Eris is the third album from the Danish folk metal band Svartsot.

Track listing
"Staden..." - 0:48
"Gud giv det varer ved!" - 4:26
"Dødedansen" - 4:59
"Farsoten kom" - 4:32
"Holdt ned af en Tjørn" - 4:26
"Den forgængelige Tro" - 4:46
"Om jeg lever kveg" - 3:22
"Kunsten at dø" - 5:03
"Den nidske Gud" - 4:48
"Spigrene" - 4:13
"...Og Landet ligger så øde hen" - 4:46

Credits
 Thor Bager - Vocals
 Cris J.S. Frederiksen - Guitars, Mandolin, Backing vocals
 James Atkin - Bass, Backing vocals
 Danni Lyse Jelsgaard - Drums
 Hans-Jørgen Martinus Hansen - Irish whistles, Swedish bagpipes, Backing vocals, and other instruments
 Lasse Lammert - Additional guitars
 Uffe Dons Petersen - Guest vocals

References

External links
 
 
 
 

2011 albums
Svartsot albums
Napalm Records albums